The 1995 Fiji rugby union tour of Wales and Ireland was a series of matches played in October and November 1995 in Wales and Ireland by the Fiji national rugby union team.

Results
Scores and results list Fiji's points tally first.

References

1995 rugby union tours
1995
tour
1995–96 in Welsh rugby union
1995–96 in Irish rugby union
1995
1995